Rene Omar Tebbaka (29 January 1929 – 30 September 1998) was a French boxer. He competed in the men's middleweight event at the 1952 Summer Olympics. At the 1952 Summer Olympics, he lost to Floyd Patterson of the United States.

References

External links
 

1929 births
1998 deaths
French male boxers
Olympic boxers of France
Boxers at the 1952 Summer Olympics
Middleweight boxers